Ballymacmaine is a small village and townland in County Down, Northern Ireland. it is between Dollingstown and Magheralin, on the A3 route from Lurgan to Moira. In the 2001 Census it had a population of 57 people. It is within Craigavon Borough Council area.

It is a small settlement with several non-residential land uses, including commercial, recreational and community facilities.

References 

NI Neighbourhood Information System
Craigavon Area Plan 2010

See also 
List of villages in Northern Ireland

Villages in County Down
Townlands of County Down
Civil parish of Magheralin